Mega Monster is a South Korean TV series production company and a subsidiary of Kakao Entertainment.

In 2017, it was fully acquired by Kakao Entertainment's predecessor Kakao M. Since then, a portion of the stake has been acquired by KakaoPage Corp. (another predecessor of Kakao Entertainment) and Studio Dragon, a subsidiary of CJ Group.

History
 : Story Plant was founded in Goyang City by former SBS and MBC producers Kim Yang and Koo Bon-geun (who was the company's first CEO). CJ E&M acquired it later on.
 : Heart to Heart, a 16-episode TV series, premiered on tvN. It was the company's first production, in cooperation with Chorokbaem Media.
 : A Bird That Doesn't Sing, a 100-episode TV series, was aired on tvN.
 : We Broke Up, a 10-episode web series based on the same-titled Naver WEBTOON, was distributed by Naver TV, and later aired on OnStyle. It was produced in association with then-parent CJ E&M and YGKPlus.
 : Happy Home, a 51-episode TV series, was aired by MBC TV.
 : LOEN Entertainment (now Kakao Entertainment), a subsidiary of Kakao, acquired Story Plant from CJ E&M, as well as the distribution and licensing rights to its productions (from the latter's subsidiary Studio Dragon). The amount of the deal was not disclosed, and co-founders Kim and Koo decided to leave the company. Later on, LOEN's sister company Podotree (now KakaoPage) and Studio Dragon acquired 21.90% and 10.95% of the company's shares, respectively, for strategic investment. LOEN's Video Content Company head Lee Jun-ho became its new CEO. It also moved its headquarters from Goyang City to Seoul.
 : The company's name was officially changed from Story Plant Co., Ltd. to Mega Monster Corporation.
 : Children of Nobody, a 32-episode TV series, was aired on MBC TV. It was the company's first production since the management and name change. Former SBS and JS Pictures executive Kim Yong-jin co-executive produced the series with Lee, marking his first project since becoming the company's vice-president and COO the same year.
 : Touch Your Heart, a 16-episode TV series based on the KakaoPage web novel of the same title, aired its first episode on tvN. It was co-produced by Zium Content, and developed by Studio Dragon.
 : The company became the newest sponsor of the "Find the Desert's Shooting Star" Drama Screenplay Competition organized by the Broadcasting Content Promotion Foundation (BCPF).
 : Children of Nobody was nominated for Best Drama and Best Television Screenplay in the 55th Baeksang Arts Awards, being the only drama from a free-to-air broadcast network to get these nominations. These are also the first-ever nominations got by Mega Monster as a production company.
 : Mega Monster, Daum Webtoon Company (a division of KakaoPage) and the KBS Drama Production Group signed a memorandum of agreement and understanding (MOAU) for drama production at the KBS Yeouido office. The MOAU states that the three camps will produce dramas based on Daum webtoons for three years. The first project under this agreement, the TV drama adaptation of GAR2 and Teacher Oh's webtoon Dead Man's Letter, will be aired in 2020.
 March 30, 2020: Fatal Promise, a 100-episode daily TV series, premiered on KBS 2TV. Kim Yong-jin and his former SBS colleague Sohn Jae-sung (who joined the company a few months earlier) are the executive producers.
 April 6, 2020: How to Buy a Friend, an eight-episode miniseries, aired its first two episodes also on KBS 2TV. It is based on Kwon Laad's webtoon of the same title, which was first published in 2018 on Daum Webtoon.
May 4, 2020: Mom Has an Affair (co-produced by Studio S), a 120-episode daily morning drama about a single mom looking for a rich man that can be a father to her kids, premiered on SBS TV. Singer-actress Hyun Jyu-ni (on her first-ever TV series leading role throughout her career) and actor Lee Jae-hwang portray the lead roles.
August 21, 2020: Former Studio Dragon chief finance officer Jang Sai-jung was appointed as the company's new president and chief executive officer, replacing Lee Jun-ho.

Production works

Scripted programming

Non-scripted programming

Current managed people

Directors
 
 
 
 Park Jin-pyo

Screenwriters

See also
 Kakao
 CJ Group
 Kakao M
 KakaoPage
 CJ ENM
 Studio Dragon
 Culture Depot
 Hwa&Dam Pictures
 JS Pictures

Notes

References

External links
  

2014 establishments in South Korea
CJ Group subsidiaries
Kakao subsidiaries
Mass media companies established in 2014
Television production companies of South Korea
Companies based in Seoul